Lee Woo-Hyeok  (born 27 February 1993) is a South Korean footballer who plays as a midfielder for Gyeongnam FC in the K League 2.

Club career
After graduating high school, Lee joined Gangwon FC as an 18-year-old. He appeared in seven league games in his debut season. He spent most of the 2013 season on the bench, but after his team was relegated to the K League Challenge in 2014, he was given more opportunities. Based on his good performances in the K League Challenge, he returned to the K League Classic by joining Jeonbuk Hyundai Motors ahead of the 2016 season. He was part of the team winning the 2016 AFC Champions League.

However, Lee failed to make an impact at Jeonbuk and moved to Gwangju FC alongside team-mate Lee Han-do for the 2017 season. He returned to good form with Gwangju and played a major role, which, however, could not prevent the team from relegating.

Lee moved to Incheon United ahead of the 2018 season.

He moved to Gyeongnam FC in K League 2 ahead of the 2021 season. He made his competitive debut for the club on 27 February 2021, the first matchday of the season, coming on as a late substitute for Chang Hyuk-jin in a 2–1 home loss to FC Anyang.

Personal life
His brother-in-law is Bae Hyo-sung, who was his team-mate at Gangwon FC.

Career statistics

Honours
Jeonbuk Hyundai Motors
 AFC Champions League: 2016

References

External links 

Profile at Gangwon FC website 

1993 births
Living people
Association football midfielders
South Korean footballers
Gangwon FC players
Jeonbuk Hyundai Motors players
Gwangju FC players
Incheon United FC players
K League 1 players
K League 2 players
Gyeongnam FC players
People from Gangneung
Sportspeople from Gangwon Province, South Korea
South Korea under-23 international footballers